Ivy Baker Priest (September 7, 1905 – June 23, 1975) was an American politician who served as Treasurer of the United States from 1953 to 1961 and California State Treasurer from 1967 to 1975.

Early life
Priest was born in Kimberly, Utah, on September 7, 1905, to Clara Fernley and Orange D. Baker. Her father worked as a gold miner in Kimberly and later as a copper miner in the town of Bingham Canyon, while her mother ran a boarding house. She was active in politics from high school, when she worked to register voters in a mayoral campaign.

Career 
Priest was a delegate to the GOP state convention in 1932 and ran unsuccessfully for Congress in Utah on the Republican ticket in 1934. From 1934 to 1936, Priest was elected as Regional Co-Chair of the Young Republican National Federation.

Beginning in 1944, she served for several years as Utah's Republican National Committeewoman and, in 1950, ran for Congress in Utah again and lost for a second time. During Dwight D. Eisenhower's campaign for President of the United States, Priest took charge of the women's division of the Republican National Committee and was credited with the successful drive to get out the women's vote, which totaled 52 percent of Eisenhower's victory margin.

She served as Treasurer of the United States under President Eisenhower from January 28, 1953, to January 29, 1961, during which time her signature appeared on all U.S. currency.

In 1967, she became national chair of the Easter Seals.

In 1966 she was elected as a Republican to the office of California State Treasurer, narrowly unseating Democrat Bert A. Betts.  She was reelected to a second term in 1970 by a comfortable margin, but did not seek a third term due to declining health.

In 1968 she became the first woman to nominate a candidate for U.S. president for a major political party when she offered California Governor Ronald Reagan's name in a speech before the Republican National Convention. (The convention chose Richard M. Nixon.)

Personal life 
She was a member of the Church of Jesus Christ of Latter-day Saints.

On December 7, 1935, she married Roy Fletcher Priest in Salt Lake City, Utah.  He died on June 11, 1959, in Arlington, Virginia. On June 20, 1961, she married Sidney William Stevens.

She died of cancer in Santa Monica, California on June 23, 1975. She was buried in the Wasatch Lawn Memorial Park Cemetery, Salt Lake City, Utah.

Legacy
On August 29, 1954, Priest was the featured guest on What's My Line?. The recording is available on YouTube. On March 17, 1960 she was also featured on Take a Good Look with Ernie Kovacs.

Priest was the mother of Pat Priest, an actress best known for playing Marilyn Munster in the 1960s television show The Munsters and appearing in the 1967 Paramount motion picture Easy Come, Easy Go with Elvis Presley.

References and notes

External links
 
 
Ivy Baker Priest Photographs - Salt Lake Tribune Negative Collection
Ivy Baker Priest photograph collection, 1920-1975
Ivy Baker Priest papers, 1889-1975

Treasurers of the United States
1905 births
State treasurers of California
1975 deaths
People from Piute County, Utah
Women in California politics
Women in Utah politics
Utah Republicans
California Republicans
20th-century American politicians
20th-century American women politicians
Latter Day Saints from California